Greatest Hits is a compilation album by the American rock band Journey, originally released in 1988 by Columbia Records. It is the band's best-selling career disc, spending 752 weeks on the Billboard 200 albums chart (more than any other compilation album, except for Bob Marley and the Wailers' Legend, in history). Additionally, as of March 2023, it has logged 1,389 weeks on Billboard's Catalog Albums chart.

On 22 April 2008, the Recording Industry Association of America (RIAA) certified Greatest Hits 15× Platinum for sales of 15 million copies in the United States. As of December 2008, it was reported to have been the sixth highest certified 'greatest hits' package in the United States according to the RIAA, behind only similar collections by the Eagles, Billy Joel, Elton John, and the Beatles' red and blue compilations.

It continues to be one of the most popular 'best of' packages, at times selling close to 500,000 copies globally per year. The album has been reissued several times and was digitally remastered for compact disc by Legacy Recordings, issued on August 1, 2006, with "When You Love a Woman" featured as a bonus track. In Japan, the album has been reissued as Open Arms: Greatest Hits with the song "Open Arms" appearing as the first song on the album. A second Journey compilation album, Greatest Hits 2, was released in 2011.

Track listing

Personnel
 Steve Perry – lead vocals
 Neal Schon – guitar, vocals
 Jonathan Cain – keyboards, vocals except on "Wheel in the Sky", "Any Way You Want It", "Lights" and "Lovin', Touchin', Squeezin'"
 Gregg Rolie – keyboards, vocals on "Wheel in the Sky", "Any Way You Want It", "Lights" and "Lovin', Touchin', Squeezin'"
 Ross Valory – bass, vocals except on "I'll Be Alright Without You", "Girl Can't Help It" and "Be Good to Yourself"
 Randy Jackson – bass on "I'll Be Alright Without You", "Girl Can't Help It" and "Be Good to Yourself"
 Steve Smith – drums, vocals except on "Wheel in the Sky", "Lights", "I'll Be Alright Without You", "Girl Can't Help It" and "Be Good to Yourself"
 Aynsley Dunbar – drums on "Wheel in the Sky" and "Lights"
 Larrie Londin – drums on "I'll Be Alright Without You", "Girl Can't Help It" and "Be Good to Yourself"

Production personnel
 Mike Stone and Kevin Elson – producers on "Only the Young", "Don't Stop Believin'", "Faithfully", "Ask the Lonely", "Who's Crying Now", "Separate Ways", "Open Arms" and "Send Her My Love"
 Roy Thomas Baker – producer on "Wheel in the Sky", "Lights" and "Lovin', Touchin', Squeezin'",
 Steve Perry – producer on "I'll Be Alright Without You", "Girl Can't Help It" and "Be Good to Yourself"
 Geoffrey Workman and Kevin Elson – producers on "Any Way You Want It"
 Kevin Shirley – producer on "When You Love a Woman"

Charts

Weekly charts

Year-end charts

Certifications

See also 
 List of best-selling albums in the United States

References 

1988 greatest hits albums
Albums produced by Kevin Elson
Albums produced by Roy Thomas Baker
Albums produced by Mike Stone (record producer)
Journey (band) compilation albums
Columbia Records compilation albums
Legacy Recordings compilation albums